The 2018 World Under-17 Hockey Challenge is an ice hockey tournament that will be held in Quispamsis and Saint John, New Brunswick, Canada from November 3 and 10. The World Under-17 Hockey Challenge is held by Hockey Canada annually to showcase young hockey talent from Canada and other strong hockey countries.

Challenge results

Preliminary round

Group A

Results

Group B

Results

Play Offs

Final standings

External links
Official Website

U-17
U-17
U-17
U-17
U-17
U-17
World U-17 Hockey Challenge
Ice hockey competitions in New Brunswick
Ice hockey in Saint John, New Brunswick